Azur Velagić (born 20 October 1991) is a Bosnian professional footballer who plays for German club SGV Freiberg.

Club career
Velagić made his debut for Regensburg on 20 July 2013 in a 3. Liga match against SpVgg Unterhaching. He left Türkgücü München for SGV Freiberg in February 2021.

References

External links
 
 

1991 births
Living people
Footballers from Munich
German people of Bosnia and Herzegovina descent
Citizens of Bosnia and Herzegovina through descent
Association football central defenders
German footballers
Bosnia and Herzegovina footballers
Bosnia and Herzegovina youth international footballers
FK Olimpik players
FC Ingolstadt 04 II players
FC Ingolstadt 04 players
SSV Jahn Regensburg players
FC 08 Homburg players
SV Rödinghausen players
Türkgücü München players
SGV Freiberg players
Premier League of Bosnia and Herzegovina players
3. Liga players
Regionalliga players